Sam Andreas Larsson (born 10 April 1993) is a Swedish professional footballer who plays as a winger for Süper Lig club Antalyaspor.

Club career

IFK Göteborg
Born in Gothenburg, Sam Larsson made his first start in the Swedish top-flight, Allsvenskan for IFK Göteborg in March 2013, in a game against local rivals BK Häcken. By scoring once and assisting two more in a 3–0 win, Larsson quickly made his way to the headlines, with manager Mikael Stahre describing him as a "Swedish Brazilian", he furthermore earned himself the nickname "Samba-Sam", due to his impressive skills on the ball and unpredictable moves.

After a successful first season, Larsson made further progress during the following year, gaining much praise for his creative play and taking on a larger role in leading his team on the attack.

Heerenveen

2014–15 season
On 12 August 2014, IFK Göteborg announced the transfer of Larsson to Dutch side Heerenveen. On 23 August, Larsson played his first league game for his new club, a game in which he scored once to settle a 2–0 win over SBV Excelsior. After an injury-plagued first period, Larsson started to achieve much praise for his performances, including comparisons being drawn by Heerenveen manager Dwight Lodeweges between Larsson and Argentinian star Lionel Messi. Heerenveen ended the season in 7th place in the Eredevisie, with Larsson scoring eight and assisting to four goals in 25 games.

2015–16 season
In his second season with Heerenveen the club experienced a struggling period, finding themselves in the lower half of the table. Larsson's goal-scoring was less frequent than the previous spring, although he was recognised as the one player creating the most goal-scoring opportunities in the Eredivisie, while also being hailed by Heerenveen technical director Hans Vonk as the best dribbler in the league. Heerenveen finished the season in 12th while Larsson scored six goals and assisted another eight. At the end of the year, Larsson was awarded a place in the team of the season by Dutch newspaper De Telegraaf.

Feyenoord
On 21 August 2017, Larsson joined Feyenoord on a four-year contract. On 9 September, Larsson made his debut for Feyenoord in an away game against Heracles Almelo, in which he also scored Feyenoord's 4th goal. On 25 October, Larsson scored his first hat-trick in his career in the second round of the KNVB Cup against AVV Swift. He won the KNVB Cup with Feyenoord scoring a total of 4 goals.

On 8 August 2018, Feyenoord won the Johan Cruyff Shield against PSV Eindhoven. The game ended in 0–0, resulting in a penalty shootout that ended 5–6. Larsson missed his penalty.

Dalian Professional 
On 28 February 2020, Larsson joined Dalian Professional on a three-year contract.

International career

Larsson got his first call up to the senior Sweden side for 2018 FIFA World Cup qualifiers against Luxembourg and Bulgaria in October 2016, however he later withdrew from the squad through injury. In the 30th minute of his debut for Sweden away against Hungary on 15 November 2016, Larsson scored from a free kick.

In 2018, Larsson was called up to the senior Sweden side again, ahead of the friendly match against Austria on 6 September 2018 and the 2018–19 UEFA Nations League match against Turkey on 10 September 2018.

Personal life
He is the younger brother of former professional footballer Daniel Larsson.

Career statistics

Club

International
As of 6 September 2018.
Appearances and goals by national team and year

International goals
Scores and results list Sweden's goal tally first.

Honours
;IFK Göteborg
 Svenska Cupen: 2012–13

Feyenoord
 KNVB Cup: 2017–18
Johan Cruijff Shield: 2018
Sweden U21
 UEFA European Under-21 Championship: 2015

References

External links
 
 
 IFK Göteborg profile

1993 births
Living people
Swedish footballers
Sweden youth international footballers
Sweden under-21 international footballers
Sweden international footballers
Swedish expatriate footballers
IFK Göteborg players
SC Heerenveen players
Feyenoord players
Dalian Professional F.C. players
Antalyaspor footballers
Allsvenskan players
Eredivisie players
Chinese Super League players
Expatriate footballers in the Netherlands
Expatriate footballers in China
Expatriate footballers in Turkey
Footballers from Gothenburg
Association football midfielders